Casearia gladiiformis, the sword-leaf, is a small tree that occurs mostly in dry coastal forests of south-eastern Africa. It is distributed from the Eastern Cape to Malawi. It bears small inconspicuous flowers in spring. The seeds are released when the woody seed capsule splits open after drying out.

Gallery

References
 Trees of Southern Africa, K C Palgrave, 1984  

Trees of South Africa
Flora of Mozambique
Flora of Malawi
gladiiformis